Nanshanaspis is a genus of asaphid trilobites of the family Raphiophoridae that lived during the late Caradoc of Inner Mongolia, China. Like all raphiophorids it is blind, with a headshield (or cephalon) that is subsemicircular, carrying genal spines and a forward directed spine on the central raised area (or glabella), with the front of the glabella inflated and the natural fracture lines (or sutures) of the cephalon coinciding with its margin. It is easily distinguished from most other raphiophorids by the 3 thorax segments. Pseudampyxina, Taklamakania, and Kongqiangheia also have only 3 such segments, while all other raphiophorid genera have at least 5 thorax segments, leading to the erection of the subfamily "Taklamakaniinae" to contain these four genera. "Taklamakaniinae" was dissolved and its members absorbed into Raphiophorinae when further study showed the close similarities the "taklamakaniids" had to the juvenile forms of various raphiophorinids.  Specimens of Nanshanaspis, for example, closely resemble juveniles of Globampyx trinucleoides.

The primary difference between Nanshanaspis and Taklamakania is the presence of a long spine emanating from the glabellum of Taklamakania: Nanshanaspis differs from Pseudampyxina in the shape of the animals' respective glabella, and Nanshanaspis differs from Kongqiangheia in both glabella variation, and in the structure of the genera's respective pygidia.

References 

Raphiophoridae
Asaphida genera
Ordovician trilobites of Asia
Fossils of China
Fossil taxa described in 1960